Michael Allen may refer to:

Sports
 Michael Allen (cricketer) (1933–1995), English cricketer
 Michael Allen (cyclist) (born 1935), American cyclist
 Mick Allen (rower) (born 1938), Australian Olympic rower
 Michael Allen (footballer) (born 1949), English footballer
 Michael Allen (golfer) (born 1959), American golfer
 Michael Allen (Canadian football) (born 1964), Canadian football player
 Michael Allen (rugby union) (born 1990), Irish rugby union player

Politics
 Michael Allen (California politician) (born 1947), former member of the California State Assembly
Mike Allen (New Brunswick politician) (born 1960), member of the Canadian House of Commons
 Mike Allen (Alberta politician) (born 1962), member of the Legislative Assembly of Alberta

Other
 Michael P. Allen (born 1967), American judge
 Michael W. Allen (born 1946), software engineer and author, CEO of Allen Interactions
 Michael Allen, American historian who co-authored A Patriot's History of the United States
 Michael Allen (architect), architect who designed the Rogers Centre (SkyDome) in Toronto
 Michael Allen Gillespie (born 1951), American philosopher
 Michael Allen (journalist) (born 1964), U.S. political reporter for Axios, formerly for Politico
 Mike Allen (poet) (born 1969), American writer of speculative fiction and speculative poetry
 Mike Allen, higher education leader and 7th president of Barry University
 Michael Allen, author of the literary blog Grumpy Old Bookman
 VL Mike (1976–2008), American rap artist from New Orleans, Louisiana
 Mick Allen (musician), bass guitarist and vocals for Rema-Rema, The Wolfgang Press and The Models

See also
 Michael Allan (born 1983), American football tight end
 Allen (surname)